The 1990 DFB-Pokal Final decided the winner of the 1989–90 DFB-Pokal, the 47th season of Germany's premier knockout football cup competition. It was played on 19 May 1990 at the Olympiastadion in West Berlin. 1. FC Kaiserslautern won the match 3–2 against Werder Bremen to claim their first cup title.

Route to the final
The DFB-Pokal began with 64 teams in a single-elimination knockout cup competition. There were a total of five rounds leading up to the final. Teams were drawn against each other, and the winner after 90 minutes would advance. If still tied, 30 minutes of extra time was played. If the score was still level, a replay would take place at the original away team's stadium. If still level after 90 minutes, 30 minutes of extra time was played. If the score was still level, a drawing of lots would decide who would advance to the next round.

Note: In all results below, the score of the finalist is given first (H: home; A: away).

Match

Details

References

External links
 Match report at kicker.de 
 Match report at WorldFootball.net
 Match report at Fussballdaten.de 

1. FC Kaiserslautern matches
SV Werder Bremen matches
1989–90 in German football cups
1990
May 1990 sports events in Europe
1990 in Berlin
Football competitions in Berlin